The albums discography of American country singer-songwriter Dolly Parton includes 52 studio albums (consisting of 48 solo studio albums, two studio albums with Emmylou Harris and Linda Ronstadt, one studio album with Loretta Lynn and Tammy Wynette and one studio album with Kenny Rogers), nine live albums, six soundtrack albums, one extended play and approximately 222 compilation albums globally. Popularly referred as the "Queen of Country" by the media, she is also widely recognized as the most honored woman in country music history. She has charted 25 Number One songs (a record for a female country artist), 41 Top 10 country albums (a record for any artist) and has sold more than 100 million records worldwide, making her one of the best selling female country artist in history. As of January 2022, Parton's catalog has amassed more than 3 billion global streams.

Dolly Parton made her album debut in 1967 (she had previously achieved success as a songwriter for others), with her album Hello, I'm Dolly. With steady success during the remainder of the 1960s (both as a solo artist and with a series of duet albums with Porter Wagoner), her sales and chart peak came during the 1970s and continued into the 1980s; Parton's subsequent albums in the later part of the 1990s were lower in sales. At this time, country pop ruled the country albums and singles chart. However, in the new millennium, Parton achieved commercial success again. She has released albums on independent labels since 2000, including albums on her own label, Dolly Records.

Studio albums

1960s

1970s

1980s

1990s

2000s

2010s–2020s

Extended plays

Live albums

Soundtrack albums

Cast albums

Promotional albums

Video albums

Audiobooks

Notable compilation albums

There have been over 200 compilation albums of Parton's material released over the years. The table below presents notable compilation albums. To be considered notable the album must contain some previously unreleased material, have appeared on a music chart, or have received a certification.

Other album appearances

Parton has contributed to over 100 other albums throughout her career. These contributions range from solo recordings and duets to providing backing and harmony vocals for other artists. This additional work spans Parton's entire career, beginning in 1966 when she provided uncredited harmony vocals on Bill Phillips' recording of her composition "Put It Off Until Tomorrow" through her most recent collaboration with Positive Vibrations in 2022, a reggae version of her 1978 hit "Two Doors Down".

Notes

References

External links

Discographies of American artists
Country music discographies